Yang Jisheng (born November 1940) is a Chinese journalist and author. His work include Tombstone (墓碑), a comprehensive account of the Great Chinese Famine during the Great Leap Forward, and The World Turned Upside Down (天地翻覆), a history of the Cultural Revolution. Yang joined the Communist Party in 1964 and graduated from Tsinghua University in 1966. He promptly joined Xinhua News Agency, where he worked until his retirement in 2001. His loyalty to the party was destroyed by the 1989 Tiananmen Square massacre.

Although he continued working for the Xinhua News Agency, he spent much of his time researching for Tombstone. As of 2008, he was the deputy editor of the journal Yanhuang Chunqiu in Beijing. Yang is also listed as a Fellow of China Media Project, a department under Hong Kong University.

Tombstone: The Great Famine
Beginning in the early 1990s, Yang began interviewing people and collecting records of the Great Chinese Famine of 1959–1961, in which his own foster father had died, eventually accumulating ten million words of records. He published a two-volume 1,208-page account of the period, in which he aimed to produce an account that is authoritative and can stand up to the challenge of official denial by the Chinese government. He begins the book, "I call this book Tombstone. It is a tombstone for my [foster] father who died of hunger in 1959, for the 36 million Chinese who also died of hunger, for the system that caused their death, and perhaps for myself for writing this book." The book was published in Hong Kong and is banned in mainland China. In 2012 translations into French, German, and English (which has been condensed almost by 50%) have been published. He was reported to be banned from leaving China to receive the award in a ceremony in Harvard University to be held in March 2016.

Praise 
Journalist Anne Applebaum praised the book as being the definitive account of the Great Famine.

Yang was awarded The Stieg Larsson prize 2015 for his 'stubborn and courageous work in mapping and describing the consequences' of The Great Leap Forward. Yang was awarded the 2016 Louis M. Lyons Award for Conscience and Integrity in Journalism, selected by the Nieman Fellows at Harvard University. In the award citation, the fellows stated: "Through the determination and commitment required for this project, Mr. Yang clearly demonstrates the qualities of conscience and integrity. He provides inspiration to all who seek to document the truth in the face of influences, forces and regimes that may push against such transparency."

Criticism 
Sun Jingxian, a Chinese mathematician, saw in the book a direct attack of China's political system asserting that Yang had done that by committing a distorted historical investigation. He argued that Yang made serious methodological errors in his assumption that starvation deaths could be calculated by looking at the difference between the average number of deaths for a given period and the actual number of deaths for that same year. Sun believed that this was an absurd mathematical formula and he called the book "extremely deceptive", characterizing it as faulty, inadequate and even fraudulent. In an academic paper, Sun wrote: As a professional mathematician [...] we must seriously point out that from an academic point of view, [Yang's methodology] completely violates the basic principles that modern mathematics must follow when dealing with such problems.Additionally, political scientist and historian Yang Songlin disputes several of Yang Jisheng's claims, such as that the Chinese government under-reported deaths or manipulated data.

Economic historian Cormac Ó Gráda, reviewing the book, stated that: "Yang tends to neglect the famine historical context and China's economic vulnerability". He notes that China was the "land of famine" because it was extremely poor and, in the 1950s, China was still extremely poor. Ó Gráda also asserts that Yang's estimate of 40 million fewer births is excessive.

Response to Criticism 
Yang strongly dismissed related criticisms, especially from Sun Jingxian. He argued that the sources about population loss were reliable and Sun's claims were baseless and Sun himself seemed to be the case. Yang accused Sun of lacking basic knowledge about Chinese household registration system at that time and frequently using ad hominem attack.

Awards 
2013 Hayek Book Prize and Lecture by the Manhattan Institute for Policy Research.
2015 Stieg Larsson Prize
 "for his stubborn and courageous work in mapping and describing the consequences of The Three Years of Great Chinese Famine"
2015 Award from the Independent Chinese PEN Center (for the Chinese language version)
2016 Louis M. Lyons Award for Conscience and Integrity in Journalism

Published works
 墓碑 －－中國六十年代大饑荒紀實 (Mubei – - Zhongguo Liushi Niandai Da Jihuang Jishi) ("Tombstone: An Account of Chinese Famine in the 1960s"), Hong Kong: Cosmos Books (Tiandi Tushu), 2008,  . By 2010, it was appearing under the title: 墓碑: 一九五八-一九六二年中國大饑荒紀實 (Mubei: Yi Jiu Wu Ba – Yi Jiu Liu Er Nian Zhongguo Da Jihuang Shiji) ("Tombstone: An Account of Chinese Famine From 1958–1962").
 Tombstone: The Untold Story of Mao's Great Famine, trans. Stacy Mosher and Guo Jian, Publisher: Allen Lane (2012),  (English Translation of the above work)
天地翻覆——中国文化大革命史, ISBN 9789888258369
The World Turned Upside Down: A History of the Chinese Cultural Revolution, English translation of above book, translated and edited by Stacy Mosher and Guo Jian, New York: Farrar, Straus and Giroux (2021), .
"Renverser ciel et terre - La tragédie de la Révolution culturelle, 1966–1976, French translation of 天地翻覆 by Louis Vincenolles, Éditions du Seuil, 2020年,

See also
Hungry Ghosts: Mao's Secret Famine
Mao's Great Famine

References

External links
Richard McGregor. The man who exposed Mao’s secret famine. The Financial Times. 12 June 2010. 
 Ian Johnson. Finding the Facts About Mao’s Victims. The New York Review of Books (Blog), 20 December 2010

People's Republic of China journalists
Living people
1940 births
People from Huanggang
Writers from Hubei
Tsinghua University alumni
Xinhua News Agency people